E. A. Badoe was an Emeritus Professor in surgery at the University of Ghana Medical School.

University of Ghana Medical School
Prior to the first medical school being set up in Ghana, Badoe was one of the committee along with Alexander Kwapong and Charles Odamtten Easmon who as part of their work visited the newly opened University of Lagos and the University of Ibadan Medical Schools. He later became professor of surgery at the same medical school based on the campus of the Korle Bu Teaching Hospital in Accra.

Other activities
Badoe has served in various capacities in the Ghana Medical Association and the Ghana Academy of Arts and Sciences.

Publications
Badoe has published many articles related to surgery and was the lead for the first locally written surgery textbook below.

References

Living people
Ghanaian surgeons
Academic staff of the University of Ghana
Year of birth missing (living people)
20th-century Ghanaian educators
Academic staff of the University of Ghana Medical School
Fellows of the Ghana Academy of Arts and Sciences